Karya Siddhi Hanuman Temple is a Hindu temple in Frisco, Texas. Its one of the biggest temples in the area. It is one of two Hindu temples in Frisco, the other being Hindu Temple of Frisco.

History
Construction on the temple started around 2007 for Hindus in the Dallas-Fort Worth area and completed in 2009. The main deity of the temple is Hanuman. The temple opened on July 23, 2015, and a week later, on August 1, KSH Temple set the world record for the longest continuous chanting with over 24 hours of recitation of Hanuman Chalisa. The Chant was led by Sri Ganapathy Sachchidananda Swamiji and was his 3rd world record. The temple is open all days of the week.

Facilities
KSH Temple cost $11 million and regularly offers worship services along with classed in Yoga, Carnatic Music, Indian Dancing and Indian Chanting as well as classes on Hinduism. The Temple also offers language learning classes for Hindi, Marathi, Telugu, Tamil, Kannada and Gujarati. The Temple also has a prayer hall, a cafeteria, a dining hall, an auditorium and a stage. The Temple's most notable feature is its 72 foot tall "rajagopuram", a tower designed to allow sunlight to pass through from one end to the other.

References

Hinduism in the United States
Hindu temples in Texas
Religious buildings and structures completed in 2015
2015 establishments in Texas
Indian-American culture in Texas
Buildings and structures in Collin County, Texas
Asian-American culture in Texas